Evangelia Chantava (born 26 October 1990) is a Greek female professional volleyball player.

Career 
She was born in Grevena and started her volleyball career at the age of 7 playing for her hometown's club, Grevena G.C. In 2005 at the age of 15, Chantava took the first big step in her career, when suddenly from playing against local teams, she found herself competing in the A1 league with Iraklis Thessaloniki (2005–2009) alongside great athletes. While she was playing for Iraklis she took the opportunity at the age of 16 to play with the Greece women's national volleyball team for the first time.

After that and for the next two seasons (2009–11) she signed a contract with Olympiacos. On 16 April 2011, they won the Greek Cup, the first trophy for the women's club. Chantava was voted most valuable player. After a successful year for the club and her personally, she took another important step in her career and signed with Terre Verdiane Fontanellato (Italian 2nd league) for the 2011–2012 season. For the next season, she moved to Izmir and signed a one-year-contract (2012–2013) with Karşıyaka (Turkish 2nd league), and her team qualified for the final four of the Turkish cup, the first time in history of Turkish volleyball that a team from second division beat a team from first division and they played the final four of Turkish cup against Vakıfbank, Galatasaray and Eczacıbaşı. They took the 4th place. For the next season she turned back in Greece for the team of Nargile Vrilissia (1st division-Greece) and with very good performances she took the MVP of the year 2013–2014. After that, a very good opportunity came to her career opening a bigger door in the world of volleyball and for 2014–2015 she signed for Lokomotiv Baku (1st division-Azerbaijan).

Titles

National cups 
 2010/2011  Greek Cup, with Olympiacos Piraeus
 2015/2016  Romanian Cup, with CSM Târgoviște
 2021/2022  Greek Cup, with Panathinaikos
 2021/2022  Greek League, with Panathinaikos

Awards 
(2016) Cup Winner (1st place) of Romanian Championship with CSM Targoviste
(2014) Most Valuable Player award for the championship – Nargile F.O. (Greece)
(2011) First place in Greek Final Cup with Olympiacos – Most Valuable Player award
(2009) Second place in Greek Final Cup with Iraklis Thessalonikis – Most Valuable Player award for the Women's All Star Game
(2006) 8th place in the World School Championship Federation in Porec of Croatia
(2005–2008) Three school championships with Aristotelio College
(2005–2009) Two U19 girls and one U17 Greek Championship

References

External links 
 

1990 births
Living people
Greek women's volleyball players
Olympiacos Women's Volleyball players
Panathinaikos Women's Volleyball players
Sportspeople from Grevena
21st-century Greek women